Nectophryne, or African tree toads, is a small genus of true toads with only two species. They are native to West and Central Africa: Nigeria, Cameroon, Gabon, northeastern Congo, Bioko and Equatorial Guinea. Nectophryne afra uses small bodies of water to lay its eggs which are then guarded by the male.

Species
The genus contains two species.

References

External links
  taxon Nectophryne at http://www.eol.org
  Taxon Nectophryne at https://www.itis.gov/index.html
  Taxon Nectophryne at http://data.gbif.org/welcome.htm

 
Amphibians of Sub-Saharan Africa
Amphibian genera
 
 
Taxa named by Wilhelm Peters
Taxa named by Reinhold Wilhelm Buchholz